Nicole Lise Boivin is an archaeologist and former director of the Max Planck Institute for the Science of Human History.

Education and career

Boivin has a BSc in cellular, molecular and microbial biology from the University of Calgary (1992), and an MPhil (1996) and PhD (2001) in archaeology from the University of Cambridge. Following her PhD she held a Fyssen Foundation postdoctoral research fellowship at Université de Paris X and CNRS in 2005, and a research fellowship at the Leverhulme Centre for Human Evolutionary Studies in Cambridge (2006–2008). This was followed by a senior research fellowship at the University of Oxford. She also held a senior research fellowship at Jesus College. She joined the Max Planck Institute for the Science of Human History as director of the Department of Archaeology in July 2016.

Controversy
In October 2021, she was removed from her position at the Max Planck Institute, after an investigation found evidence of "scientific misconduct and bullying". The full details of the case have not been made publicly available, but the summary of the findings includes "claiming credit for the work of others, and workplace bullying of institute staff and younger researchers". Concerns have also been expressed about misogyny at the Max Planck Society. In December 2021, a court in Berlin re-instated Boivin as a director, a decision which the Max Planck Society is appealing. In April 2022, she was removed a second time as director of the Max Planck Institute for the Science of Human History (MPI-SHH), following a vote by a governing board of the Max Planck Society. Boivin continues to dispute the decision and has openly criticised the lack of transparency in the disciplinary process at the society.

Research

Boivin's research is multi-disciplinary, spanning the natural sciences and humanities. Her research includes investigating human migrations out of Africa in the Late Pleistocene, to maritime trade and biological exchange in the Indian Ocean during the last two thousand years. She was awarded a European Research Council starting grant (2007–2014) for the Sealinks project, which investigated the emergence of long-distance trade and connectivity in the Indian Ocean, and its relationship to processes of biological exchange and translocation. Her work examines long-term human history and the relationships between people and the environment on a global scale. At the Max Planck Institute for the Science of Human History, her Department's work explores the diverse ways that data about the past can inform modern day challenges including climate change, anthropogenic transformation of species and environments, and food security. Her research has been funded by the Wenner Gren Foundation, the Australian Research Council, the McDonald Institute for Archaeological Research, and the British Academy.

She is the author of Material Cultures, Material Minds: The Role of Things in Human Thought, Society and Evolution published in 2009 by Cambridge University Press), and co-editor of several books including Human Dispersal and Species Movements: From Prehistory to the Present (2017, Cambridge University Press) and Globalisation and the ‘People without History’: Understanding Contact and Exchange in Prehistory (2018, Cambridge University Press), and Soils, Stones and Symbols: Cultural Perceptions of the Mineral World, published by Routledge in 2004.

Awards 

Boivin was recipient of the Prehistoric Society Bob Smith Award in 2002, the joint winner of the 2011 Antiquity Ben Cullen Prize, and nominated Fellow of the Society of Antiquaries in 2013.

Selected publications 

 Boivin, N., Fuller, D.Q., Dennell, R., Allaby, R. & Petraglia, D. 2013. Human dispersal across diverse environments of Asia during the Upper Pleistocene. Quaternary International 300: 32–47.
 Boivin, N., Fuller, D. & Crowther, A. 2012. Old World globalization and the Columbian Exchange: Comparison and contrast. World Archaeology 44(3): 452–69.
 Fuller, D.Q., Boivin, N., Hoogervorst, T. & Allaby, R. 2011. Across the Indian Ocean: The prehistoric movement of plants and animals. Antiquity 85: 544–558.
 Petraglia, M.D., Haslam, M., Fuller, D.Q. & Boivin, N. 2010. The southern dispersal route and the spread of modern humans along the Indian Ocean rim: New hypotheses and evidence. Annals of Human Biology 37(3): 288–311.
 Boivin, N. & Fuller, D.Q. 2009. Shell middens, ships and seeds: Exploring coastal subsistence, maritime trade and the dispersal of domesticates in and around the ancient Arabian peninsula. Journal of World Prehistory 22: 113–180.
 Petraglia, M.D., Clarkson, C., Boivin, N., Haslam, M., Korisettar, R., Chaubey, G., Ditchfield, P., Fuller, D., James, H., Jones, S., Kivisild, T., Koshy, J., Lahr, M.M., Metspalu, M., Roberts, R. & Arnold, L. 2009. Population increase and environmental deterioration correspond with microlithic innovations in South Asia ca. 35,000 years ago. Proceedings of the National Academy of Sciences 106: 12261–12266.

References 

Living people
Canadian women archaeologists
Canadian archaeologists
University of Calgary alumni
Year of birth missing (living people)
Max Planck Institute for the Science of Human History